Charles Howard Hinton (1853 – 30 April 1907) was a British mathematician and writer of science fiction works titled Scientific Romances. He was interested in higher dimensions, particularly the fourth dimension. He is known for coining the word "tesseract" and for his work on methods of visualising the geometry of higher dimensions.

Life
Hinton's father, James Hinton, was a surgeon and advocate of polygamy. Charles Hinton was born in the United Kingdom. His siblings included the costume designer Ada Nettleship (1856 – 1932).

Hinton taught at Cheltenham College while he studied at Balliol College, Oxford, where he obtained his B.A. in 1877.  From 1880 to 1886, he taught at Uppingham School in Rutland, where Howard Candler, a friend of Edwin Abbott Abbott's, also taught. Hinton also received his M.A. from Oxford in 1886.

In 1880 Hinton married Mary Ellen, daughter of Mary Everest Boole and George Boole, the founder of mathematical logic. The couple had four children: George (1882–1943), Eric (*1884), William (1886–1909) and Sebastian (1887–1923) (inventor of the jungle gym and father of William and Joan Hinton).

In 1883 he went through a marriage ceremony with Maud Florence, by whom he had had twin children, under the assumed identity of John Weldon.  He was subsequently convicted of bigamy and spent three days in prison, losing his job at Uppingham. His father James Hinton was a radical advocate of polygamous relationships, and according to Charles' mother James had once remarked to her: "Christ was the saviour of Men but I am the saviour of Women and I don't envy him a bit."

In 1887 Charles moved with Mary Ellen to Japan to work in a mission before accepting a job as headmaster of the Victoria Public School. In 1893 he sailed to the United States on the SS Tacoma to take up a post at Princeton University as an instructor in mathematics.

In 1897, he designed a gunpowder-powered baseball pitching machine for the Princeton baseball team's batting practice. The machine was versatile, capable of variable speeds with an adjustable breech size, and firing curve balls by the use of two rubber-coated steel fingers at the muzzle of the pitcher. He successfully introduced the machine to the University of Minnesota, where Hinton worked as an assistant professor until 1900, when he resigned to move to the U.S. Naval Observatory in Washington, D.C.

At the end of his life, Hinton worked as an examiner of chemical patents for the United States Patent Office.  At age 54, he died unexpectedly of a cerebral hemorrhage on 30 April 1907 in Washington, D.C. After Hinton's sudden death his wife, Mary Ellen, committed suicide, also in Washington, D.C., in May 1908.

Fourth dimension

In an 1880 article entitled "What is the Fourth Dimension?", Hinton suggested that points moving around in three dimensions might be imagined as successive cross-sections of a static four-dimensional arrangement of lines passing through a three-dimensional plane, an idea that anticipated the notion of world lines. Hinton's explorations of higher space had a moral basis:

Hinton argues that gaining an intuitive perception of higher space required that we rid ourselves of the ideas of right and left, up and down, that inheres in our position as observers in a three-dimensional world. Hinton calls the process "casting out the self", equates it with the process of sympathizing with another person, and implies the two processes are mutually reinforcing.

Hinton created several new words to describe elements in the fourth dimension. According to the OED, he first used the word tesseract in 1888 in his book A New Era of Thought. Alicia Boole Stott, his sister in law who knew him at Oxford supervised the publication of the book whilst he was abroad. He also invented the words kata (from the Greek for "down from") and ana (from the Greek for "up toward") to describe the additional two opposing fourth-dimensional directions (an additional 4th axis of motion analogous to left-right (x), up-down (y), and forwards-backwards (z)).

Hinton's Scientific romances, including "What is the Fourth Dimension?" and "A Plane World", were published as a series of nine pamphlets by Swan Sonnenschein & Co. during 1884–1886.  In the introduction to "A Plane World", Hinton referred to Abbott's recent Flatland as having similar design but different intent. Abbott used the stories as "a setting wherein to place his satire and his lessons. But we wish in the first place to know the physical facts." Hinton's world existed along the perimeter of a circle rather than on an infinite flat plane. He extended the connection to Abbott's work with An Episode of Flatland: Or How a Plane Folk Discovered the Third Dimension (1907).

An Episode of Flatland or How a Plane Folk Discovered the Third Dimension… (1907)
An Episode of Flatland or How a Plane Folk Discovered the Third Dimension, to which is bound up An Outline of the History of Unæa  made its public debut in 1907, even receiving a paragraph review (though not particularly flattering) in the British scientific journal Nature (1907). The action plays out in the planar world of two-dimensional "Astria" with the primary characters partaking in various adventures, scientific and romantic. Ultimately, some "Astrians" come to accept and comprehend the reality and fullness of three-dimensions in a world beyond their immediate comprehension. The book consists of a Preface, Introduction, a post-introductory section titled The History of Astria, and the Episode (referred to in the title) composed of twenty short chapters. Overall, it is longer than Edwin A. Abbott's novella Flatland… (1884); Hinton's narrative contains approximately 53,720 words.

Hinton's work combines various literary and scientific features, with the author intent on popularizing the idea of "higher dimensions" among educated Edwardian readers including such diverse groups as religious thinkers and believers, experimental scientists, artists, stodgy academics, engineers, politicians, and others of various persuasions and agendas. Recognizing the existence of, and even reaching, a "higher dimension" was not simply part and parcel to a strictly mathematical game; for Charles H. Hinton (1907), during an era when spiritualism (with the obligatory séances) was running rampant, it was important to point the way toward a higher realm of existence in both intellectual and genuinely spiritual terms.

Influence 
Hinton's advocacy of the tesseract as a means to perceive higher dimensions spawned a long lineage of science fiction, fantasy, and spiritual works that similarly refer to the tesseract as a way to understand—or even access—higher dimensions, including Charles Leadbeater's Clairvoyance (1899), Claude Bragdon's A Primer of Higher Space (1913), Algernon Blackwood's Victim of Higher Space (1914), H. P. Lovecraft's  The Shadow Out of Time (1935), Robert Heinlein's "—And He Built a Crooked House—" (1941), Madeleine L'Engle's A Wrinkle in Time (1962), and Christopher Nolan's film Interstellar (2014).

Hinton was one of the many thinkers who circulated in Jorge Luis Borges's pantheon of writers.  Hinton is mentioned in Borges' short stories "Tlön, Uqbar, Orbis Tertius", "There Are More Things" and "El milagro secreto" ("The Secret Miracle"): 

Hinton influenced P. D. Ouspensky's thinking.  Many of ideas Ouspensky presents in "Tertium Organum" mention Hinton's works.

Hinton's "scientific romance", the "Unlearner", is cited by John Dewey in Art as Experience, chapter 3. The story described by John Dewey is actually titled "An Unfinished Communication" and is part of the second series of "Scientific Romances". The Unlearner is a character in this story, which might explain why John Dewey confused the title of the story.

Hinton is the main character in Carlos Atanes's play Un genio olvidado (Un rato en la vida de Charles Howard Hinton) ("A Forgotten Genius (The Life and Time of Charles Howard Hinton)"). The play premiered in Madrid during May 2015, and was published in May 2017.

Hinton is mentioned several times in Alan Moore's graphic novel From Hell; his theories regarding the fourth dimension form the basis of the book's final chapter.  His father, James Hinton, appears in chapters 4 and 10.

He is mentioned twice in Aleister Crowley's novel Moonchild. The first mention mistakenly names his father, James Hinton.

Works
 and 2nd series at Internet Archive
A New Era of Thought, orig. 1888, reprinted 1900, by Swan Sonnenschein & Co. Ltd., London
The Fourth Dimension, orig. 1904, 1912 by Ayer Co., Kessinger Press reprint, at Project Gutenberg, scanned version available online at the Internet Archive
Speculations on the Fourth Dimension: Selected Writings of Charles H. Hinton, edited by Rudolf Rucker, 1980, Dover Publications,  (includes selections from Scientific Romances, The Fourth Dimension, "The Recognition of the Fourth Dimension" from the 1902 Bulletin of the Philosophical Society of Washington, and excerpts from An Episode of Flatland)
 An Episode of Flatland or How a Plane Folk Discovered the Third Dimension orig 1907, Swan Sonnenschein & Co. Limd., uncut illustrated HTML version online at Forgotten Futures
 What is the Fourth Dimension? (1880)

See also

 Hinton's honeycomb
 Hinton's polytope
 Spissitude
 Alicia Boole Stott

Notes

Further reading
   Illustrated cultural history, with links to primary sources and secondary literature.

External links

 
 
 Hinton's writings at ibiblio.org
 
 
 
 
 Digitized works by Charles Howard Hinton at Toronto Public Library

1853 births
1907 deaths
19th-century British mathematicians
19th-century British novelists
20th-century British mathematicians
Alumni of Balliol College, Oxford
British people convicted of bigamy
British science fiction writers
British Theosophists
People educated at Uppingham School
Hinton family